Microphallidae is a family of trematodes (flukes).

References

Plagiorchiida
Trematode families